Sham Shui Po Sports Ground is public sports ground located in Cheung Sha Wan, Kowloon, Hong Kong. It opened on 9 January 1988.

Facilities
1 all-weather, international standard 400-metre running track (8 lanes)
1 grass pitch with flood lights
1 spectator stand with 2,194 seats
1 car park (accommodates 12 private cars and 3 coaches)
1 fast food kiosk

Football
Fourway Athletics will use the sports ground as the home stadium in 2009–10 season. 

In the 2011–12 Hong Kong First Division League season, Sham Shui Po uses the sports ground for all its home matches. On 18 September 2011, the sports ground registered its first ever full house for a Hong Kong First Division League match, but Sham Shui Po was defeated by visitors South China by 0-2.

In 2017-18, Rangers moved their home matches back to Sham Shui Po Sports Ground.

The following season, due to Rangers' relegation, Hoi King became the new tenant of the ground.

In 2019-20, due to Eastern's selection of Tseung Kwan O Sports Ground as their home stadium, Lee Man moved to Sham Shui Po Sports Ground.

1999 Standard Chartered Hong Kong Marathon
In 1999, the Standard Chartered Hong Kong Marathon started in Central District on Hong Kong Island on Chater Road and finished at Sham Shui Po Sports Ground.

References

External links

Official website

Sports venues in Hong Kong
Football venues in Hong Kong
Cheung Sha Wan
Multi-purpose stadiums in Hong Kong
1988 establishments in Hong Kong
Sports venues completed in 1988